The 2012 FIBA Under-17 World Championship (Lithuanian: 2012 m. FIBA iki 17 metų pasaulio čempionatas) was the 2nd edition of the FIBA Under-17 World Championship, the biennial international men's youth basketball championship contested by the U17 national teams of the member associations of FIBA. It was hosted by Kaunas, Lithuania from 29 June to 8 July 2012.

The United States defeated Australia to win their second title. Jahlil Okafor was named tournament MVP.

Qualification
12 teams have qualified for this year's edition.

2011 FIBA Africa Under-16 Championship

2011 FIBA Asia Under-16 Championship

2011 FIBA Americas Under-16 Championship

2011 FIBA Europe Under-16 Championship 

2011 FIBA Oceania Under-16 Championship

Host country

Preliminary round
The draw took place on January 10, 2012.

Times given below are in EEST (UTC+3).

Group A

Group B

9th–12th playoffs

Semifinals

Eleventh place playoff

Ninth place playoff

Knockout stage

Quarterfinals

5th–8th semifinals

Semifinals

Seventh place playoff

Fifth place playoff

Bronze medal game

Final

Final standings

Awards

All-Tournament Team

  Dante Exum
  Mario Hezonja
  Justise Winslow 
  Gabriel Deck
  Jahlil Okafor

Statistical leaders

Points

Rebounds

Assists

Blocks

Steals

Referees 
The International Basketball Federation (FIBA) named the following 19 referees to officiate the basketball games at this tournament.

  Hussain Hassan Ahmed M. Albloushi
  Chung Yi-Chih
  Roberto José Fernandez Diaz
  Damir Javor
  Carlos Jose Julio
  Jurgis Laurinavičius
  Guilherme Locatelli
  Petri Mantyla
  Sergey Mikhaylov
  Anastasios Piloidis
  Christopher Antony Reid
  Diego Hernan Rougier
  Alejandro Sanchez Varela
  Thomas James Short
  Borys Shulga
  Roberto Vazquez
  Eddie Viator
  Robert Vyklicky
  Jakub Zamojski

Broadcasting rights 
 - Lietuvos rytas TV

References

External links
 2012 FIBA U17 World Championship

2012
2012–13 in Lithuanian basketball
International youth basketball competitions hosted by Lithuania
2012 in basketball
Sport in Kaunas